The Century Tower Condominiums, formerly known as the Trustees System Service Building, is a historic building located at 182 West Lake Street in the Loop in Chicago, Illinois.

History
The building was designed in 1929 and completed in 1930; at the time of its completion, it was the tallest reinforced concrete building in the world. Its original tenant and namesake was the Trustees System Service, a bank that specialized in consumer loans. Architects Thielbar and Fugard designed the building in the Art Deco style. The building's design consists of a twenty-story main building topped by an eight-story tower and a ziggurat. The building has had a long list of various countries' consulates as tenants.

The building was added to the National Register of Historic Places on September 3, 1998.

The property was converted from a commercial building to apartments in 2003. In August, 2004 the building was used to film scenes from the movie Batman Begins. In September 2005 the building became a condominium and its name changed to Century Tower.

Former tenants
The building was once home to:
 WIND (AM) radio.
 WJJD (AM) radio.
 the Belgian consulate.
 the Chinese consulate.
 the Cuban consulate.
 the Dominican consulate.
 the Grecian consulate.
 the Honduran consulate.
 the Hungarian consulate.
 the Italian consulate.
 the Mexican consulate.
 the Philippine consulate.

The red marble used in the lobby is from an ancient Roman quarry in the city of Oran, Algeria.

The building is listed in the National Register of Historic Places.

Former names
This building has formerly been named:

 Skyline Century of Progress 
 The Lake and Wells Building 
 The 201 Tower 
 Corn Products Building 
 Trustees System Service Building

References

Commercial buildings on the National Register of Historic Places in Chicago
Residential skyscrapers in Chicago
Chicago Landmarks
1930 establishments in Illinois
Commercial buildings completed in 1930